B.A.P Live on Earth 2014 Continent Tour was a 2014 concert tour headlined by the South Korean boyband B.A.P. The tour was held from March to June 2014 in Seoul, New York, Dallas, Chicago, Los Angeles, Düsseldorf, Paris, London, Melbourne, Sydney, Taipei, Singapore, Fukuoka, Nagoya, Osaka, Chiba, and Bangkok. The concert's main theme was 'Earth Needs You,' and six keywords (Justice, Emotion, Passion, Love, Happiness, and You) related to the theme made up the continuity.

A week before the start of their South American leg, TS Entertainment released an official statement canceling B.A.P's tour in South America due to insufficient time for the artists to rest and recharge. TS Entertainment stated that they placed their artists condition as top priority when canceling this tour.

Reception 

On March 9, B.A.P’s Seoul concert was broadcast in movie theaters in Taiwan, Hong Kong, and Japan. It is estimated that 20,000 global fans were able to view the concert in real-time with B.A.P. After 11 months, BAP returned to America with their first stop in New York city selling out. The European leg of the tour was the largest concert tour by a Korean artist in Europe at the time, with 20,000 fans expected to attend.

About this tour Bang Yong Guk, the group's leader said:

Setlist

Concerts

References

2014 concert tours
B.A.P (South Korean band) concert tours